Kembayan, or Mateq (Mate’), is a Dayak language of Borneo.

References

 

Languages of Indonesia
Land Dayak languages